Roser Vives (born 5 February 1984) is a Spanish butterfly swimmer who competed in the 2004 Summer Olympics.

References

1984 births
Living people
Spanish female butterfly swimmers
Olympic swimmers of Spain
Swimmers at the 2004 Summer Olympics